An issue tree, also called logic tree, is a graphical breakdown of a question that dissects it into its different components vertically and that progresses into details as it reads to the right.

Issue trees are useful in problem solving to identify the root causes of a problem as well as to identify its potential solutions. They also provide a reference point to see how each piece fits into the whole picture of a problem.

Types
According to professor of strategy Arnaud Chevallier, elaborating an approach used at McKinsey & Company, there are two types of issue trees: diagnostic ones and solution ones. Diagnostic trees break down a "why" key question, identifying all the possible root causes for the problem. Solution trees break down a "how" key question, identifying all the possible alternatives to fix the problem.

Rules
Four basic rules can help ensure that issue trees are optimal, according to Chevallier:
 Consistently answer a "why" or a "how" question
 Progress from the key question to the analysis as it moves to the right
 Have branches that are mutually exclusive and collectively exhaustive (MECE)
 Use an insightful breakdown

The requirement for issue trees to be collectively exhaustive implies that divergent thinking is a critical skill.

Applications

In management interviews
Issue trees are used to answer questions in case interviews for management consulting positions. A quantitative type of question, the market sizing question, requires the interviewee to estimate the size of a data group such as a specific segment of a population, an amount of objects, a company's revenues, or similar. The candidates are expected to use a structured and logical method of arriving at their answer, and using an issue tree provides a diagram to aid the candidate's logical reasoning. Issue trees are used for other types of case interview questions as well.

See also
 Five whys
 Horizon scanning
 Ishikawa diagram
 Root cause analysis
 Why–because analysis

References

Further reading
 
 
 
 
 

Diagrams
Knowledge representation
Management consulting
Problem solving methods
Futures techniques